Devil Dog Dawson is a 1921 American silent Western film directed by Karl R. Coolidge and starring Jack Hoxie, Helene Rosson and Evelyn Selbie. It was produced by Unity Photoplays and released on the states-rights market by Arrow Film Corp.

Many remaining scenes from this film were thought to have been cut at the time because they depicted alcohol consumption, which was illegal at the time.

Plot
A group of three settlers in Oregon have their horses stolen by outlaws. Their horses are returned by three cowboys. The cowboys later save the settlers again when they are threatened by farmworkers.

Cast
 Jack Hoxie
 Helene Rosson
 Evelyn Selbie
 Wilbur McGaugh
 Arthur Mackley

Preservation
The film was considered lost. Previously, the only surviving footage from this film—38 seconds' worth—was found in a mislabeled tin by a collector in Ohio. The title marked on the tin was Dangerous Hour – Eddie Polo. The canister and its contents were the subject of an investigation in a 2006 episode of the PBS series History Detectives. The film segment was preserved and restored by the Library of Congress. Another copy has been since located in the French archive Centre national du cinéma et de l'image animée in Fort de Bois-d'Arcy.

References

External links
 "Silent Film Reel" at History Detectives website
 

1921 films
1921 Western (genre) films
American black-and-white films
1920s rediscovered films
Rediscovered American films
Arrow Film Corporation films
Silent American Western (genre) films
1920s American films